Arenimonas donghaensis is a Gram-negative and aerobic bacterium from the genus of Arenimonas which has been isolated from sand from Pohang in Korea.

References

Xanthomonadales
Bacteria described in 2007